Self-enucleation also known as autoenucleation or oedipism is the self-inflicted enucleation (removal) of the eye. It is considered a form of self-mutilation and is normally caused by psychosis, paranoid delusions or drugs. Between 1968 and 2018 there were more than 50 documented cases of "complete or partial self-enucleation in English medical journals". According to a 2012 study published in the British Journal of Ophthalmology, self-enucleation may be "considered to be the result of psycho-sexual conflicts" even if psychosis is a more likely cause. A particularly extreme form of self-mutilation, self-enucleations are rarely reported.

History
A famous case of self-enucleation can be found in Greek mythology: Oedipus, according to Sophocles's tragedy Oedipus Rex, gouged his own eyes out after discovering he had married his mother.

In the 13th century, Marco Polo witnessed a pious Baghdad carpenter who enucleated his right eye for sinful thoughts of a young female customer.

In the 19th century, Jews in the Pale of Settlement in eastern Europe sometimes resorted to self-mutilation, including blinding themselves in one eye, to avoid the Russian empire's onerous regime of military conscription.

On February 6, 2018, a 20-year old American, Kaylee Muthart, received national attention after she gouged both her eyes out while high on methamphetamine, believing that "sacrificing her eyes [would] save the world".  The incident left Muthart permanently blind, though she later said "I'm happier now than I was before all this happened".

In March 2019, Tanya Suárez removed her own eyes in a San Diego, California, county jail while under the influence of methamphetamine. She sued San Diego county, alleging that a sheriff's deputy watched her from outside her cell door but did nothing; video footage to that effect has reportedly been seen in court, but not released to the public. In October 2022, she settled with the county for $4.35m.

References

Symptoms and signs of mental disorders
Neurological disorders
Self-harm
Body modification